Irina Yurievna Rozanova (born 22 July 1961) is a Russian actress. She has appeared in more than 80 films and television shows since 1985. In 2008 she was a member of the jury at the 30th Moscow International Film Festival.

Biography
Rozanova was born in Penza on 22 July 1961. In early 1962 Irina's family moved to Ryazan. Her parents are actors Yuri Rozanov and Zoya Belova.

Awards
 Meritorious Artist of Russia (1995) 
 Nika Award (2005; for Best Supporting Actress)
 People's Artist of Russia (2007)
 Golden Eagle Award (2013; for Best TV Actress)

Selected filmography
 Where is the Nophelet? (1988) as Valentina
 The Servant (1989) as Maria
 Intergirl (1989) as Sima Gulliver
 I Hope for You (1992) as Ira
 Encore, Once More Encore! (1992) as Lyuba Antipova
 Zone of Lyube (1994)
 The Rifleman of the Voroshilov Regiment (1999) as Katya's Mother
 Mechanical Suite (2001) as Olga
 Lines of Fate (2003) as Katerina Vershinina
 Gloss (2007) as Marina Yurievna
 Hipsters (2008) as Polza's Mother
 Peter the Great: The Testament (2011) as Catherine I of Russia
 Two Days (2011) as Larisa Petrovna
 Love (2021)
 Tell Her (2021)
 Little Red Riding Hood (2022)
 Non-Orphanage (2022) as psychologist

References

External links

1961 births
Living people
Russian film actresses
20th-century Russian actresses
21st-century Russian actresses
People from Ryazan
Soviet film actresses
Honored Artists of the Russian Federation
People's Artists of Russia
Recipients of the Nika Award
Russian Academy of Theatre Arts alumni
Soviet stage actresses
Russian stage actresses
Russian television actresses